Fernbank Forest is a 65-acre (25 hectares) mature mixed forest that is part of Fernbank Museum of Natural History in Atlanta, Georgia. It has some relatively old trees compared to much of the forests in the Piedmont; as such, it has been extensively studied by scientists. There also are a few equally tall loblolly pine. Other canopy species include American beech, black oak, northern red oak, southern red oak, pignut hickory, bitternut hickory, mockernut hickory, winged elm and red maple. Eastern flowering dogwood, sourwood, umbrella magnolia and eastern redbud are prominent among the smaller trees. The forest floor is covered by many shrub, wildflower, and fern species.

Common animals include raccoon, coyote, opossum, gray squirrel, chipmunk, American crow, pileated woodpecker, box turtle and several snake species, including the venomous copperhead.

The soils are mostly well-drained, with medium brown or dark reddish brown sandy loam topsoils. The subsoils are clay loam or clay; they are medium red or dark red. The darker soils, which support higher plant diversity, have developed on mafic rock; the medium-toned soils are on felsic rock.

History

Fernbank Forest was purchased from Col. Z. D. Harrison in 1939 by a group of citizens who organized Fernbank, Inc., which today operates as Fernbank Museum of Natural History  for the conservation and preservation of this old-growth forest to inspire and teach about nature. Fernbank is the 4th oldest environmental conservation not-for-profit in the United States. In 1964 the Fernbank Trustees developed a 48-year lease which was accepted by the DeKalb County Board of Education, agreeing to manage and maintain the forest in exchange for offering free access to the public. The lease was renewable in eight-year intervals for a maximum of 48 years.

Controversy 2012 - 2014
The transfer of the lease from Dekalb County School System in 2012 led the closing of the forest and subsequent controversy. At the time, self-guided tours were not allowed in the forest due to safety concerns. A Move-On petition garnered over 500 signatures to allow public access to the Forest. Concerned community members claimed the forest was not being maintained, leading to a possible reduction of educational opportunities in the forest for local school children. Community members were concerned about the lack of transparency since none of the plans were initially made public.

Forest reopens 
In September 2016, after a 4-year restoration period, the forest reopened as part of the Fernbank Museum of Natural History. Visitors to the museum can join guided tours with museum educators or go on self-guided tours along the paths of the forest. The museum now offers outdoor educational programming for students in the metro Atlanta area.

See also
Fernbank Museum of Natural History
Fernbank Science Center

References

External links
 Fernbank Forest official website
The Natural History of Atlanta
New Georgia Encyclopedia: Piedmont
Web Soil Survey (select Dekalb County, Georgia)
David O. Funderburk and James N. Skeen. Spring Phenology in a Mature Piedmont Forest. Castanea, Vol. 41, pp. 20–30, 1976.

Geography of Atlanta
Urban forests in the United States
Forests of Georgia (U.S. state)
Protected areas of DeKalb County, Georgia
Druid Hills, Georgia